NGC 4781 is a barred spiral galaxy in the constellation Virgo. It was discovered by William Herschel on Mar 25, 1786. It is a member of the NGC 4699 Group of galaxies, which is a member of the Virgo II Groups, a series of galaxies and galaxy clusters strung out from the southern edge of the Virgo Supercluster.

See also
 List of NGC objects (4001–5000)

References

External links
 

Barred spiral galaxies
Virgo (constellation)
4781
043902